Robert Paterson (8 September 1916 – 29 May 1980) was an English cricketer. He played for Essex between 1946 and 1958.

References

External links

1916 births
1980 deaths
English cricketers
Essex cricketers
People from Stansted Mountfitchet
Marylebone Cricket Club cricketers